Karalahna is a Turkish red wine grape variety grown in Tenedos. It is used as a wine grape by making both varietal and blending with other grape varieties. In Tenedos, it is often blended with Kuntra grape variety.

Viticulture 
Karalahna usually ripens in the second half of September, the bunches of Karalahna are dense and round, the skin of the berries are not very thick.

References 

Grape varieties of Turkey
Red wine grape varieties